Chestertons is a British estate agency chain.

First established in 1805 by Charles Chesterton (1779 – 1849), the firm has mainly been based in London, but has expanded into international markets, including the Middle East. Chestertons has over 100 offices in 21 countries.

History

1805: Charles Chesterton establishes the company; becomes the agent for Phillimore Estate in Kensington, an agent for the Phoenix Insurance Group (now part of Royal & Sun Alliance), a churchwarden, and a prominent figure in the Kensington vestry.

1830: Charles's son Arthur Chesterton ensures succession, establishing Chesterton & Sons with his sons Edward & Sidney Rawlins; ownership remains in the family until 1980.

1929: Chestertons is involved in the valuations of three famous Kensington High Street stores: Derry & Toms, Pontings and Barkers.

1965: Sir Henry Wells is the first of two Chestertons executives to serve as the president of the RICS. 

1968: Sir Oliver Chesterton, the last direct member of the Chestertons family, becomes the second of two executives to serve as the president of RICS

1986 Chesterton sell Chestertons Residential to Prudential plc

1987 Chesterton merges with rivals from Birmingham (Colliers Bigwood and Bewlay) and Bristol to become Chesterton International

1991 Chesterton International becomes a limited company after 186 years as a partnership

1992 Chesterton International returns to the residential market acquiring De Groot Collis for £2.416 million, Elliot Son & Boyton and Brian Rushton are also acquired in this year

1993 Despite "probably the most difficult year that the property industry in the UK has experienced since the 1950s", Chesterton continued their acquisitions with the Manchester office merging with Guest Shaw, the acquisition of John E Mitchell heralding the opening of a Nottingham office and the purchase of John Hubbard, and Pollock & Buchan bolstering the companies presence in the North East of England and London respectively

1994 Chesterton International gains a listing on the London Stock Exchange and acquired Conroy Hunter in Scotland, Consolidated FPM Group Goddard and Smith, and quantity surveyors; Cyril Sweett

1995 Hall Pain & Foster and Bell-Ingram acquired

1996 Chesterton International reacquires Chestertons Residential for £8 million from Woolwich Property Services who had purchased the firm from Prudential in 1991. After disappointing results, the company made several changes to its senior management with Chief Executive Giles Ballantine stepping down and the appointment of Ian Fleming as finance director, who joined from Wimpey Homes. In order to grow the business Chesterton acquired Workplace Management from ICL, British Gas Properties Facilities Management Limited from British Gas plc and became a founding partner in Exchequer Partnership plc a special purpose vehicle formed along with Bovis Ltd, Stanhope plc, Chelsfield plc and Hambros Bank to bid for the PFI contract for the refurbishment of Government Offices Great George Street, London to house HM Treasury.

1997 The group reported a £7 million trading loss for the year, resulting in disposals of; part of the residential property management business, the plant and machinery business, withdrawal from the joint brokerage business in the US, the sale of the holding in the joint US mortgage advisory venture, the sale of the only Chestertons Residential office outside of London (in Henley-on-Thames) and the restructure of the French, Spanish and Thai businesses. Despite Exchequer Partnership plc being named as the preferred bidder, negotiations regarding refurbishing the Treasury buildings were terminated due to the financial risks to the government

1998 A merger with The Summit Group plc was announced in February 1998, however by year end this had been abandoned at a cost of £414,000. The group posted pre-tax losses of £2.1 million and further disposals ensued including the disposal of Cyril Sweett Quantity Surveyors, Carter Primo Chesterton (a US asset management business), Residential Property Management (block management), Chesterton Netherlands and Chesterton Binswanger Capital Advisors. In addition Chesterton y Associados in Spain was closed, as was Chesterton Thai. Negotiations between Exchequer Partnership and HM Treasury restart

1999 The group posted a pre-tax profit of £4 million, as opposed to a loss in previous years, and launched Chesterton Structured Finance and Chesterton Facilities and Property Partnering, the latter to build on the company's position as a market leader in PFI

2000 In May 2000 the contract for the refurbishment of Government Offices Great George Street is signed by Exchequer Partnership plc (by now consisting of Chesterton, Bovis Lend Lease and Stanhope), for commencement on site in July 2000, with a scheduled completion date of August 2002

2001 During the year the firm acquired Dixon Studd and expanding their residential operations to operate for the first time outside of London

2002 Further residential operations were commenced in Newcastle and Manchester, continuing the expansion of these operations outside the capital. After disappointing results in 2001 and a loss in 2002, the company announced in May 2002 that a preliminary approach to purchase the company, if an offer were not forthcoming it was advised that the company would look to go private and de-list from the Stock Exchange

2003 Chesterton International is, after a long and colourful battle including; the withdrawal of a bid from a listed company, the sacking of the Chief Executive and Chief Operating Officer and a 'spoiler' bid from Manchester & Metropolitan, taken over by Phoenix Acquisitions, a vehicle of Mohammed Jafari-Fini with the company being delisted from the Stock Exchange in July 2003. As a backdrop to this, the company posted a £14.8 million pre-tax loss for the year. The company would go on in the latter part of the year to sell its Facilities Management division to Johnson Service Group and its share in Exchequer Partnerships to other partners; Stanhope and Bovis Lend Lease.

2004 Mohammad Jafari-Fini loses control of Chesterton International due to the default on a loan by Phoenix Acquisitions, and this default sees Resurge plc who lent Phoenix £12.86 million for the acquisition of Chesterton take control of the company. It would later transpire as a result of a High Court ruling in 2006 that the default was due to a payment by Jafari-Fini which was said by the court to be a bribe. Chesterton reduces losses to £4.4 million for the year.

2005: Chesterton International is placed into receivership by Royal Bank of Scotland. Part of the commercial arm of the company was sold to Atisreal UK (a subsidiary of BNP Paribas) which bought the commercial offices in the City of London, Southampton, Cardiff, Newcastle and Leeds. The Chesterton brand stayed with the residential division which was purchased as a 16 office strong operation focused on central London by a joint venture between Vincent Tchenguiz, Credit Mercantile Group and CIC International. The cost was £900,000 for the company and £3.1 million set aside for liabilities. 

2006: Robert Bartlett is hired as Chief Executive. Despite a first year loss, results for 2006 showed a return to profit and saw the company adopt a new visual identity, commenced the refurbishment of its flagship Kensington branch, opened a new branch in Hampstead and invested in its IT systems and website.

2007 Arqaam, formerly CIC International, and part of the Saudi Arabian Commercial Investment Corporation sells its stake in Chesterton to Vincent Tchenquiz and Credit Mercantile Group. Chesterton Global purchase Millest & Partners (located in Sevenaoks, the firms first branch outside of London), Copping Joyce, Stickley & Kent, Moss Kaye Pemberton (marking a return for the company to commercial agency) and building surveyor Vann and Jones. During the summer of 2007 the company also expanded internationally, opening its first European office in St Tropez with offices and Gibraltar and Italy following.

2008 The company posted its third loss in four years, this years loss being the result of the Credit Crunch In December 2008, Mercantile purchase Vincent Tchenquiz's stake, giving them full ownership of Chesterton. Mercantile had previously bought the 34-strong chain of Humberts (founded in 1842) out of administration, along with 10 branches of its Farleys and Wellingtons chains in June of the same year for £3.16 million. The move to take full ownership of Chesterton gave them a complimentary wider ownership within the sector.

2009: Chestertons merges with Humberts (bringing together two of the longest established firms in the industry), the business is rebranded as Chesterton Humberts. The firm acquires a former franchised operation of two branches in the South East of England, strengthening their representation in this geographic area.

2011 Chesterton Global acquire Nottingham based chartered surveying firm; Robert Clarke to strengthen its commercial business, along with opening new offices in Kew, Italy and Barbados

2012 New offices are opened in St Johns Wood and Kensington within the UK, with overseas offices in Malta, Nice and Liguria being opened, along with an expansion of operations in Dubai

2013: A decision is made by the board to split Chesterton Humberts into two separate brands, with Chestertons retaining the Farleys business.

2014: The London and international business are officially rebranded as Chestertons, and the new brand is launched at Chestertons Polo in the Park. The company also launches its Chestertons Charity Champions initiative.

2015: January - Chestertons, in conjunction with other estate agents, launched the OnTheMarket.com portal.

2018: Chestertons lists all of its properties on the largest UK property websites, including Rightmove, Zoopla, PrimeLocation.com and OnTheMarket.com

2020: February - Chestertons welcomes its first international franchisee based in Greece - Chestertons Ionian

2021: January - Chestertons expands into Costa Del Sol - Spain with is new franchisee Chestertons Costa Del Sol

2021: February - Chestertons opens its first office in the African continent - Chestertons Morocco

2022: May - Guy Gittins steps down as CEO and Chestertons appoint Richard Davies as Interim Managing Director 

2022: November - Richard Davies promoted to first Chief Operating Officer 

2022: November - John Ennis joins Chestertons as Chief Executive Officer

2023: February- Chestertons became an exclusive member of Forbes Global Properties. The only agency in London to have its properties featured on the Forbes Global Properties website, reaching buyers from over 450 worldwide locations.

References

External links

Companies established in 1805
1805 establishments in England
Property companies based in London
Property services companies of the United Kingdom